A monomotor bogie is a form of traction bogie used for an electric locomotive or diesel-electric locomotive. It is distinguished by having a single traction motor on each bogie.

Development 
The first electric locomotives used large diameter electric motors, mounted rigidly on their frames and using jackshaft drives and coupling rods to carry their torque to the driving wheels. This increased their unsprung weight and limited their maximum speed, despite the greater power of electric locomotives.

Leading trucks 
To achieve a higher speed, locomotives began using wheel arrangements such as 2'Do2' (AAR: 2-Do-2), with the SNCF Class 2D2 5500  This used leading (and trailing) pony trucks or bogies to provide stability at high speed, with individual traction motors for each axle, avoiding the weight of the coupling rods. Suspension travel for each axle was achieved with a Buchli drive on each axle. Unlike the original Swiss practice with a Buchli drive on one end of the axle, the French locomotives used a double-ended drive. This was later given as a reason for the low wear rates experienced with them. These locomotives first appeared during the 1930s with the 2D2 5500, and later during the post-war push for electrification the SNCF Class 2D2 9100 (1950).

Bogies 
Shortly after the 9100 class, the French absorbed another new Swiss idea, that of the high-speed double-bogie locomotive. Previous French Bo-Bo locomotives had been considered suitable only for medium speeds, with the pony truck and rigid frame used for express passenger service.

New classes were built for French railways, embodying these principles. Two 1,500 V DC prototype Co-Co locomotives for the SNCF Class CC 7100 (1952) were built by Alsthom, the first prototypes being tested from 1949. These locomotives had conventional per-axle traction motors.

Monomotor bogies 

SNCF Class BB 16500 (1962)
SNCF Class BB 7200 (1967)

This was the first of the 'Nez Cassé' designs, by Paul Arzens.

Class CC 40100 (1964), a large quad-voltage locomotive, requiring a C'C' layout with three axle bogies.

Use 
Monomotor bogies are widely used in France, for designs by Alstom. 

They were a particular feature of the 'Nez Cassé' family of locomotives, designed by Paul Arzens.

Examples 
 SNCF Class BB 7200 DC
 SNCF Class BB 15000 AC 
 SNCF Class BB 22200 Dual-voltage, combining the attributes of both BB 7200 and BB 15000 (7200 + 15000 = 22200) 
 SNCF Class BB 26000

 NS Class 1600 Dutch version of the SNCF Class BB 7200

 FS Class E.632 (Italian)

References

Bibliography 

Locomotive parts